Thomas Dyke may refer to:

Sir Thomas Dyke, 1st Baronet (c. 1650–1706), English Tory politician
Thomas Dyke (Seaford MP) (1619–1669), MP for Seaford
Sir Thomas Dyke, 2nd Baronet (c. 1700–1756), of the Dyke baronets
Sir Thomas Dyke, 4th Baronet (1763–1831), of the Dyke baronets
Thomas Dyke (cricketer) (1801–1866), English cricketer
Tom Hart Dyke (born 1976), English horticulturist, author and plant hunter

See also
Thomas Dyke Acland (disambiguation)

Dyke (surname)